Zuzanna Maciejewska (born 19 January 1995) is a Polish former tennis player.

Maciejewska has a singles career-high ranking of 574 by the WTA, achieved on 26 August 2013. She also has a WTA doubles career-high ranking of 746, achieved on 13 October 2014.

Maciejewska made her WTA Tour debut at the 2014 Katowice Open, in the doubles event partnering Magdalena Fręch, losing in the first round to the fourth seeds Shuko Aoyama and Renata Voráčová, 1–6, 3–6.

ITF finals

Doubles (2–0)

External links
 
 

1995 births
Living people
Polish female tennis players
Sportspeople from Toruń
21st-century Polish women